Swag, SWAG, or Swagg may refer to:

Terms and slang
 Swag (motif) or festoon, a wreath or garland or a carving depicting foliage and ribbons
 Swag, fabric dressing for a  window valance
 Swag, stolen goods, in 1800s thieves cant
 Swag (promotional merchandise),  products branded with a logo or slogan and distributed at little or no cost to promote a brand, corporate identity, or event
 Swag (bedroll), a portable sleeping unit or bedroll

Arts and entertainment
 Swag (novel), a 1976 crime novel by Elmore Leonard
 Swag (TV series), a United Kingdom reality television series
 "Swag" (Ugly Betty), the eleventh episode of the television series Ugly Betty

Music
 Swag (Gilby Clarke album), a 2002 album by former Guns N' Roses guitarist Gilby Clarke
 Swag (Tomomi Itano album), a 2014 album by former AKB48 member Tomomi Itano
 Swagg (album), album by Russian rapper Timati

Acronyms
 "Supporters Without A Game", sport slang spun off from WAGs ("wives and girlfriends")
 Scientific wild-ass guess, slang for a rough estimate based on expert experience
 Sourceware Archive Group, a free collection of classified source code and sample programs written in Pascal
Sport Writers Association of Ghana, Sports Writers Association based in Ghana
 Special Warfare Group, a former name used by the Naval Special Operations Command

Other uses
 Swagg, Alabama, an unincorporated community in the United States
 Swag (cigar brand), a brand manufactured by Boutique Blends Cigars

See also
 
 
 Swagger (disambiguation)
 Swagman (disambiguation)
 SWEG or Südwestdeutsche Verkehrs-Aktiengesellschaft, a transport company in southwest Germany